Boonesborough or Boonesboro may refer to a place in the United States:

 Boonesboro, Iowa, now part of Boone, Iowa
Boonesborough, Kentucky
Boonesboro, Missouri
Boonesborough, Missouri
Boonesborough, West Virginia

de:Boonesborough